Klaus Mitffoch is a successful 1984 album by the Polish rock band Klaus Mitffoch.  The album contains principally elements of British new wave as well as Gang of Four-inspired post punk. It received several awards and it is considered to be one of the most important albums in the history of Polish rock.

Track listing 

 "Śpij aniele mój" (Sleep, my angel)
 "O głowie" (About head)
 "Wiązanka pieśni bojowych" (A mix of battle songs)
 "Nie jestem z nikim" (I'm not with nobody)
 "Klus Mitroh" 
 "Wiązanka cz. IV" (A mix, part 4)
 "Jestem tu, jestem tam" (I'm here, I'm there)
 "Muł pancerny" (Panzer mule)
 "Powinność kurdupelka" (Manlet's duty)
 "Strzelby" (Shotguns)
 "Nad ranem śmierć się śmieje" (Death laughs in the morning)
 "Tutaj wesoło" (Funny here)
 "Ewolucja, rewolucja i ja" (Evolution, revolution and me)
 "Dla twojej głowy komfort" (Comfort for your head)
 "Siedzi" (Sitting)
 "Strzeż się tych miejsc" (Beware of these places)

CD bonus tracks
  "Ogniowe strzelby" (Fiery shotguns)
 "Śmielej" (Bravely)
 "Jezu, jak się cieszę" (Jesus, I'm so glad)

Personnel

Klaus Mittfoch
 Lech Janerka – Vocal, Bass, Lyrics
 Wiesław Mrozik – Guitar
 Krzysztof Pociecha – Guitar
 Marek Puchała – Drum kit

Guest Musicians
 Wojciech Konikiewicz – keyboards

Technical
 Włodzimierz Kowalczyk – engineering
 Tadeusz Czechak – assistant engineer
 Artur Gołacki – cover
 Bożena Janerka - lyrics

References 

1984 albums
Klaus Mitffoch albums